During the 1999–2000 English football season, Oldham Athletic A.F.C. competed in the Football League Second Division.

Season summary
In the 1999–2000 season, it began in disastrous fashion with the Latics losing their first five matches and failing to score in the first four. Ritchie's side however recovered well, proving difficult to beat, and losing only four of their nineteen remaining away matches, comfortably finishing in mid-table with 61 points from their 46 league matches.

Final league table

Results
Oldham Athletic's score comes first

Legend

Football League Second Division

FA Cup

League Cup

Football League Trophy

Players

First-team squad
Squad at end of season

Left club during season

References

Notes

Oldham Athletic A.F.C. seasons
Oldham Athletic A.F.C.